Karol Beck and Jaroslav Levinský were the defending champions.
Levinský chose not to compete this year and Beck played in ATP 250 tournament in Newport instead.Marcel Granollers and Gerard Granollers-Pujol won the final against Brian Battistone and Filip Prpic 6–4, 4–6, [10–4].

Seeds

Main draw

Draw

References
Main Draw

Doubles
2010